The 1997 Arab Cup Winners' Cup was the eight edition of the Arab Cup Winners' Cup held in Ismailia, Egypt between 15 – 25 August 1997. The teams represented Arab nations from Africa and Asia.
MC Oran from Algeria won the final against Al-Shabab from Saudi Arabia.

It was decided on first that Al-Ansar will organized and hosts the eight edition in Beyrouth, Lebanon from 14 to 24 August 1997 and Olympique Khouribga will participate as the holders. However it's Al-Ismaily who hosts the tournament in Ismailia.

Qualifying round

Zone 1 (Gulf Area)

Participating teams: Al-Muharraq (Bahrain), Al-Arabi Kuwait (Kuwait), Al-Ittihad Doha (Qatar) and team from UA Emirates.

Al-Arabi Kuwait & Al-Ittihad Doha advanced to the final tournament.

Zone 2 (Red Sea)

Participating teams: Al-Shabab (Saudi Arabia), Al-Merrikh (Sudan), Al-Ahli Al Hudaydah (Yemen).

Al-Shabab advanced to the final tournament.

Zone 3 (North Africa)

Participating teams: USM Blida (Algeria), Al-Ahly Benghazi (Libya) and Wydad Casablanca (Morocco).
USM Blida (the runners-up of the 1996 Algerian cup) was replaced by MC Oran (the winners of the 1996 Algerian cup).

MC Oran & Al-Ahly Benghazi advanced to the final tournament.

Zone 4 (East Region)

Participating teams: Al-Wehdat (Jordan), Balata YC (Palestine)

Al-Wehdat and Balata YC advanced to the final tournament.

Group stage

Group A

Group B

Knock-out stage
Al-Ittihad Doha withdrew the knock-out stage, Al-Ahli Tripoli to semifinals instead.

Semi-finals

Final

Winners

References

External links
Arab Cup Winners' Cup 1997 - rsssf.com

1997
1997 in association football
International association football competitions hosted by Egypt
1997 in Egyptian sport